Alexander Pavlov (born December 22, 1977) is a Russian ice dancer. He competed with his twin sister, Elena, until 1999, and then skated with Nina Ulanova for two years, representing Russia. He later skated for Australia with Danika Bourne, competing at two Four Continents Championships. He is the brother-in-law of Alexander Abt.

Competitive highlights

With Bourne

With Ulanova

With Pavlova

References

1977 births
Russian male ice dancers
Australian male ice dancers
Living people